Events from the year 1601 in Sweden

Events

 23 June - Battle of Kokenhausen, in which Polish forces defeated the Swedish relief force and captured the besieging force, relieving the Polish garrison. The battle is known as one of the greatest victories of the Polish hussars, who defeated their numerically superior Swedish adversaries.

Births

 Date unknown - Ingierd Gunnarsdotter, folk ballad singer  (died 1686) 
 22 April- Charles Philip, Duke of Södermanland, prince  (died 1622)

Deaths

References

 
Years of the 17th century in Sweden
Sweden